Dawlat al-Islam Qamat (English: The Islamic State Has Been Established), also known by its English name My Ummah, Dawn Has Appeared, is a jihadi nasheed (chant) which became an unofficial anthem of the Islamic State. It was released in December 2013 and soon became their most popular song. The American magazine The New Republic referred to it as the most influential song of 2014.

The chant is a capella apart from sound effects of swords being drawn, feet stomping, and gunfire. It was produced by the Ajnad Media Foundation, which produces most IS songs. The song has also been used by the Nigerian jihadist group Boko Haram to accompany speeches.

Translated Lyrics 
Below are the lyrics for the chant, translated from Arabic into English.

See also 
 Salil al-Sawarim, another chant commonly used by ISIL
 This Is the Home of the Brave, Pashto-language anthem of the Taliban

References

External links 
Dawlat al-Islam Qamat at the Internet Archive

Islamic State of Iraq and the Levant mass media
National anthems
Asian anthems
Islamic music
2013 songs
Nasheeds